Katageri is a village located in Athani taluk Belgaum district, Karnataka, India.

Demographics 
The majority of the people are farmers. Villagers are educated and the literacy rate is significantly high. Many people works in government jobs, such as teachers, soldiers, police officers e.t.c

Agriculture 
Farmers mainly grow sugar cane, wheat, turmeric, ground nut, and Jowar.

References

Villages in Belagavi district